Bitartrate is an anion which is the conjugate base of tartaric acid.  It may also refer to any salt or monoester of tartaric acid.  

Some examples of bitartrate salts include:
 Choline bitartrate
 Cysteamine bitartrate
 Dihydrocodeine bitartrate
 Dimethylaminoethanol bitartrate
 Hydrocodone bitartrate
 Metaraminol bitartrate
 Norepinephrine bitartrate
 Potassium bitartrate
 Sodium bitartrate

References

Tartrates